Bollington is a town and civil parish in Cheshire, England, to the east of Prestbury. In the Middle Ages, it was part of the Earl of Chester's manor of Macclesfield and the ancient parish of Prestbury. In 2011, it had a population of 8,310.

Bollington is on the River Dean and the Macclesfield Canal, on the south-western edge of the Peak District. Rising above the town on Kerridge Hill is White Nancy, a monument built to commemorate the Battle of Waterloo.

History

From the late 18th through to the mid-20th centuries, Bollington was a major centre for cotton-spinning. Waterhouse mill, now demolished, off Wellington Road, once spun the finest cotton in the world, and was sought after by lace makers in Nottingham and in Brussels, Belgium.

Clarence Mill still stands. The lower floors remain commercial but the upper floors have been converted into apartments. One of the oldest surviving mills in Bollington is the very small Defiance Mill, built in Queen Street about 1800 and now restored for residential occupation.

There is a large paper coating mill on the site of Lower Mills. The original mill was built by George Antrobus in 1792 but very little of those buildings remain. A stone-built traditional mill still survives amongst the more recent brick developments. In the 1830s and 1840s this mill was rented to Thomas Oliver and Martin Swindells for the production of fine cotton thread for the lace-making industry. Lowerhouse mill (Antrobus, 1819, later occupied by Samuel Greg Jnr) also remains as an industrial mill, also producing coated papers.

The other remaining mill is Adelphi mill (Swindells, 1856), which is today entirely commercial.

In 1801, the population was 1,231. In 1851, the population was 4,655. In 1901, it had grown to 5,245. Population growth slowed during the mid-20th century such that by 1951 the population was 5,644. By 2001 the population had reached 7,095.

Governance 
The town falls within the Westminster constituency of Macclesfield, which is currently represented by the Conservative MP David Rutley.

Bollington is represented by two councillors on the Cheshire East Borough Council (unitary).

Bollington Town Council has parish status. There are 12 councillors. From 2012 a number of responsibilities and buildings are being taken over from Cheshire East Council, including the Civic Hall and Town Hall.

Services and provisions
Cheshire Fire and Rescue Service have a retained fire station in Bollington. The town has a medical practice on Wellington Road, and a dental surgery on Bollington Road. The town does not have its own police station; policing is provided by the Cheshire Constabulary. The town has a small yet thriving local retail community, with two bakers, three butchers, a delicatessen, and a Co-op convenience store. The town has several notable take-aways, restaurants, wine bars, and coffee shops, along with a dozen or so traditional public houses.

Education
Bollington is served by four primary schools. The Roman Catholic school of St Gregory is on Albert Road, along with the secular Dean Valley Community Primary School. The Church of England has two schools in the town, St John the Baptist Church of England on Grimshaw Lane, and Bollington Cross Church of England on Bollington Road. Secondary-aged students travel to Tytherington School, The Fallibroome Academy, The Kings School, Macclesfield, All Hallows Catholic College and Poynton High School.

Sport
The Recreation Ground, across the road from the Civic Hall and Library, provides a football pitch, bowling green, tennis court and cricket pitch, all of which are in regular use by Bollington Town F.C., Bollington Cricket Club, Bollington Athletics Club, and the Bollington Bowling Club. A further cricket pitch located along Clarke Lane, by the Lord Clyde pub, is home to Kerridge Cricket Club. Bollington has a hockey club, which plays on the King's School astroturf pitches. There are a number of other sporting activity groups including cycling, walking, and swimming. Other activities are based at the Bollington Health and Leisure Centre at Heath Road, Bollington Cross.

Bollington is home to Bollington Town Football Club, who play in a blue and yellow home strip. The club crest features White Nancy, a significant landmark within the Bollington area.

Perhaps because of its proximity to the home of British Cycling and its location between the flat Cheshire plains and the hillier Peak District, Bollington is home to a number of professional cyclists, notably Adam Blythe and Ethan Vernon.

Landmarks
Bollington is notable for White Nancy, a stone folly located on top of Kerridge Hill. At c.6m high and painted white, this 1817 monument to victory at the Battle of Waterloo is visible from as far away as Shropshire and the western hills of Cheshire. It originally had an entrance to the interior where the visitor would find a single room with stone benches and a round table. However, vandalism reportedly prompted the closure of the entrance sometime in the 20th century.

The big mills, Clarence, Adelphi and Lowerhouse, are notable examples of 19th-century mill buildings in the northwest of England.

Culture

The town has several churches. The parish Church of St John the Baptist closed in 2006, leaving St Oswald's Church in Bollington Cross as the only Anglican church. St Gregory's Church on Wellington Road is the Roman Catholic place of worship in the town. The Grade-II listed Methodist church on Wellington Road has been closed to worship and has been sold.

In 2005 Canalside Community Radio was launched to provide community news and entertainment for the duration of the festival. Cousins John and Terry Waite opened the 2005 Bollington Festival. together with the Discovery Centre. In December 2008 Canalside Radio – The Thread – began broadcasting to northeast Cheshire on 102.8 FM having obtained a full-time licence after five years of trying.

Hiking, cycling and riding through the hills around Bollington and along the Macclesfield Canal towpath as well as the Middlewood Way (a disused railway) are popular activities. Boats and bikes can be hired for day-trips and holidays at Grimshaw Lane canal wharf. The Peak District Boundary Walk runs through the town.

The town has many traditional public houses, most of which have not been modernised.

Events

Every five or six years since 1964, the town hosts the Bollington Festival, which runs for two and a half weeks and involves a wide variety of community activities, from concerts, theatrical, opera, art exhibitions, to local history events, science events and competitions. The last Festival was in 2019.

In late September each year a ten-day Walking Festival promotes exercise and fresh air while taking in the beauty of the surrounding countryside, the western hills of the Peak District.

Bollington hosts an annual 'Carols around the Christmas Tree' on Christmas Eve each year.

At mid-day on Christmas Day each year a brass band play at White Nancy.

Societies and organisations

Bollington has a branch of the Women's Institute, which meets regularly while retired gentlemen may meet at the weekly Probus, and likewise the ladies at their monthly Probus.

The Guide and Scout movements are all represented.  Bollington United Junior Football Club (JFC) has three clubs for children ranging from under-10s to under-17s. 
Bollington is home to 236 Squadron of the Royal Air Force's Air Training Corps, which has its headquarters on Shrigley Road. The Squadron had close links with 42(R) (formerly 236 OCU) of the Royal Air Force before the latter was disbanded in the government defence review in 2010. The Sea Cadets is for 10‑ to 18‑year‑olds. The Bollington and Macclesfield Sea Cadets also have a unit website.

There are numerous artistic, musical and theatrical groups all providing popular exhibitions and performances. Many of these are held at the Bollington Arts Centre.

Transport

Road
The nearest motorway junctions are J17 and 19 (Congleton and Knutsford) on the M6, and J1 (Stockport) on the M60.

Bus
Regular bus services connect Bollington with Macclesfield, Hazel Grove and Stockport.

Railway
Bollington no longer has its own railway station; the nearest being in Macclesfield, for inter-city trains to London and Manchester, and Prestbury for local stopping trains.

Bollington used to be served by the Macclesfield, Bollington & Marple Railway, which operated between Rose Hill Marple and Macclesfield. The railway was built in 1869 by the Manchester, Sheffield and Lincolnshire Railway (MS&LR) and the North Staffordshire Railway (NSR), as a part of a quest to provide an alternative link between Manchester and the south that was independent of the London and North Western Railway (L&NWR). Cotton mill owner Thomas Oliver had suggested this route hoping to revive the cotton mills of Bollington, the Kerridge stone quarries and the coal fields at Poynton. The line was closed in January 1970 as part of the Beeching closures. The trackbed is today used for walking, cycling and horseriding; it is known as the Middlewood Way.

Water
The Macclesfield Canal passes through the centre of the town and is a picturesque and rural part of the Cheshire Ring. The stretch from Marple Junction on the Peak Forest Canal to Bosley is without locks and is carried on an embankment through Bollington. Kerridge was the scene of a spectacular breach on 29 February 1912, where the water from Bosley to Bugsworth basin emptied through the town. Today, the canal is used for leisure purposes.

Media
Bollington Live! is a publication produced three times a year by a team of volunteer writers, editor and distributors. It is funded by local businesses who sponsor and advertise. It covers a wide range of issues of local interest, from historical articles, to matters of current concern. The magazine is delivered free to every household and business in Bollington, plus others in Pott Shrigley and Whiteley Green by almost fifty volunteers. The magazine was started in 1994 by a group of residents who felt that whilst Bollington was served by the neighbouring Macclesfield newspapers, it was in need of a Bollington-centred publication. All copies are available online on the town's extensive Happy Valley web site.

Notable people

 Samuel Greg (Jnr) (1804–1876), English industrialist and philanthropist, took over management of Lowerhouse Mill in Bollington in 1832 and used it as a basis for social experimentation. 
 John Ryle (1817–1887), manufacturer, was born and died in Bollington. He emigrated to the United States in 1839 and became known as the "father of the United States silk industry" and was the Mayor of Paterson, New Jersey from 1869 to 1870.
 William Collard Smith (1830 in Bollington – 1894), Australian politician, emigrated to Australia in 1852, became a politician in colonial Victoria (Australia), and was a member of the Victorian Legislative Assembly and Minister of Education from 1880 to 1881.
 Emma Brooke (1844–1926), British novelist and a campaigner for the rights of women, was brought up in Bollington.
 Jack Plant (born 1870 in Bollington), English international footballer, played professionally for Bury, and earned one cap for England in 1900.
 Sir James Chadwick  (1891 in Bollington – 1974), Nobel Prize-winning physicist who proved the existence of neutrons, was educated at Bollington Cross School.
 Terry Waite  (born 1939 in Bollington), who was held hostage for four years in Lebanon and devoted his life to humanitarian causes, lived for a very short time in Bollington; his father was one of the town's policemen.
 David Dickinson (born 1941), antiques expert and television presenter, lives in Bollington.
 Angie Lewin (born 1963 in Bollington), designer of prints and screens, was brought up in Bollington.
 James Bailey (born 1988), professional footballer, was brought up in Bollington.
 Libby Clegg, MBE (born 1990), blind athlete, was born and lived in Bollington until moving to Scotland at age 11. 
 Ben Amos (born 1990), English professional footballer who plays as a goalkeeper for Wigan Athletic, lived for some years in Bollington.

See also

Listed buildings in Bollington
Hollin Old Hall
Clarence Mill

References

External links
 Happy Valley, a full list of Bollington's mills with some histories.

 
Civil parishes in Cheshire
Towns in Cheshire
Towns and villages of the Peak District